High Hopes: The Amityville Murders is a book written by Gerard Sullivan and Harvey Aronson and tells the story of Ronald DeFeo, Jr. and how he murdered his family. A 2018 film was based on the book.

Plot summary
The book is based on trial testimony of the 1974 murder of the DeFeo family and takes place from the prosecutor's point of view. Gerard Sullivan was the prosecutor in the case. The book tells of Ronnie's nine-year stay at the house on Ocean Ave. It tells how Ronnie starts to become increasingly more mentally unstable, using drugs, getting into fights. It goes up to how Ronnie killed his family. Then it goes to the aftermath and the court and eventually his conviction. The book does not deal with anything supernatural and is only about the DeFeos. It also talks about the insanity plea. A very controversial event is also mentioned in the book. The event which is now unverifiable, tells of a 1972 drowning that may have been caused by Ronald DeFeo, Jr. The only mention of the haunting is in a sentence at the end of the book.

Title
The title of the book came from author Harvey Aronson, from a sign posted in the DeFeo's front lawn which read "High Hopes". Aronson explained, "When they moved from Brooklyn and when they bought that house that they had High Hopes."

Reception
The book received good reviews. The Boston Herald called it "more frightening than any ghost story".

References

The Amityville Horror
1981 American novels
American horror novels
Babylon (town), New York